Kelly Kraft (born October 5, 1988) is an American professional golfer.

Amateur career
Kraft was born in Denton, Texas. During his final year at Billy Ryan High School, 2006–07, Kraft served as team captain while earning All-District honors. 

While attending Southern Methodist University (SMU), he played college golf for the SMU Mustangs.

Kraft won the 2011 Trans-Mississippi Amateur in July. He then won the 2011 U.S. Amateur in August, beating world-number-one Patrick Cantlay in the final, 2 up. The win earned Kraft a spot in the Masters Tournament, U.S. Open, and Open Championship in 2012. In September 2011, Kraft played on the 2011 Walker Cup team. In November 2011, Kraft finished as top amateur at the Emirates Australian Open, finishing in a tie for 19th.

Professional career
Kraft turned professional after competing in the 2012 Masters Tournament. In doing so, he forfeited his invitations to the 2012 U.S. Open and 2012 Open Championship. Kraft played in eight tournaments on the PGA Tour in 2012 through sponsor exemptions. He played on the Web.com Tour from 2013–2015 with a best finish of second at the 2013 Mylan Classic until his first win on March 15, 2015 at the Chitimacha Louisiana Open.

Kraft has three solo second place finishes on the PGA Tour: one in February 2017 at the AT&T Pebble Beach Pro-Am, finishing at –15, four strokes behind the winner Jordan Spieth, the next in July 2018 at A Military Tribute at The Greenbrier finishing at −14, five strokes behind Kevin Na and the last in July 2019 at the Barbasol Championship finishing at −25, one stroke behind Jim Herman.

Personal life
In April 2013, Kraft and Tia Gannon were married in Sea Island, Georgia.

Amateur wins
2008 Texas Amateur
2011 Texas Amateur, Trans-Mississippi Amateur, U.S. Amateur, South Beach International Amateur

Professional wins (1)

Web.com Tour wins (1)

Results in major championships

CUT = missed the half-way cut
"T" = tied for place

Results in The Players Championship

CUT = missed the halfway cut
"T" indicates a tie for a place
C = Canceled after the first round due to the COVID-19 pandemic

U.S. national team appearances
Walker Cup: 2011

See also
2015 Web.com Tour Finals graduates
2016 Web.com Tour Finals graduates
2021 Korn Ferry Tour Finals graduates

References

External links

Profile on Southern Methodist's official athletic site

American male golfers
SMU Mustangs men's golfers
PGA Tour golfers
Korn Ferry Tour graduates
Golfers from Dallas
Sportspeople from Denton, Texas
1988 births
Living people